"And We Danced" is a song by Macklemore, under the alter-ego Raven Bowie, and features singer Ziggy Stardust. It was released as a single on October 31, 2011 by Macklemore LLC.

Background
Unlike later releases by Macklemore like "My Oh My", "Wing$", "Same Love", and the major hits "Thrift Shop" and "Can't Hold Us", all taken from Macklemore & Ryan Lewis, this release was taken from his 2009 mixtape, The Unplanned Mixtape, and only credits Macklemore and "Ziggy Stardust". Primarily due to the popularity of the single "Thrift Shop", the song charted in 2013 in Austria, France, Ireland and Switzerland.

Music video
The music video was shot in 2011 and was directed by Griff J and Ryan Lewis. The music video was uploaded to Ryan Lewis's YouTube channel and has over 130 million views as of October 2021. Contrary to the song's own release data, it states Macklemore x Ryan Lewis as the artists.

Chart performance

Weekly charts

Year-end

Release history

Certifications

References

2009 songs
2011 singles
Macklemore songs
Songs about dancing
Songs written by Macklemore
Song recordings produced by Ryan Lewis
Songs containing the I–V-vi-IV progression